The Grand Hotel Europe, A Belmond Hotel is a historic five-star luxury hotel on Nevsky Prospect in Saint Petersburg, Russia.

History
One of the great hotels of 19th-century Europe, the Grand Hotel d'Europe opened on 28 January 1875, replacing an earlier inn situated on the same site.

In the 1910s, the hotel was remodeled in the Art Nouveau style to designs by Fyodor Lidval and Leon Benois. During the Soviet period, the hotel was known as the Hotel Evropeiskaya. It was completely restored between 1989 and 1991 and reopened in December 1991, managed by the Swedish Reso Hotels chain as the Reso Grand Hotel Europe.

The hotel was featured in the 1995 James Bond movie GoldenEye. However, the movie was not filmed at the hotel, the exterior used was actually the Langham Hotel, London, while the interiors were sets.

Its marble-and-gilt interiors, sweeping staircases and elegant furniture have attracted crowds of well-to-do visitors, including Peter Ilyich Tchaikovsky, Elton John, Bill Clinton, Ivan Turgenev, Claude Debussy, H. G. Wells, Igor Stravinsky, Gustav V of Sweden, Jacques Chirac and Bo Savander to name only a few notables who lodged there.

The hotel was renamed the Belmond Grand Hotel Europe in 2014 when its parent company, Orient-Express Hotels, was renamed Belmond Ltd.

References

External links

Hotels in Saint Petersburg
Tourist attractions in Saint Petersburg
Second Empire architecture
Nevsky Prospekt
Belmond hotels
Hotels established in 1875
Art Nouveau architecture in Saint Petersburg
Art Nouveau hotels
Hotel buildings completed in 1875
Cultural heritage monuments of regional significance in Saint Petersburg